Beuil is a commune in the Alpes-Maritimes department in southeastern France.

Geography
It is the gateway to the Mercantour National Park. A stop-off in the Red-rocked Gorges of the Cians and Daluis.

The commune is traversed by the Raton River.

The Valberg ski resort is, in part, located on this town.

Arms
The blazon of the arms is as follows:
"Or, a star with sixteen rays Gules."

Population

See also
Communes of the Alpes-Maritimes department

References

External links
 Official site

Communes of Alpes-Maritimes
Alpes-Maritimes communes articles needing translation from French Wikipedia